Choghamish or Chogha Mish may refer to:
Chogha Mish, an archaeological site in Iran
Choghamish, Iran, a village in Iran
Choghamish District, an administrative subdivision of Iran
Choghamish Rural District, an administrative subdivision of Iran